Erode Arts College is an arts college in Rangampalayam, Erode, Tamil Nadu, India, founded in 1971.  The college belongs to the Mudaliar Educational Trust, which also includes Dr. RANM Arts & Science College.

The Erode Arts College is NAAC accredited with 'A' Grade, offering various programmes in the arts and science stream. It is an autonomous co-educational institution affiliated to Bharathiar University, Coimbatore. The professional courses offered have been approved by the All India Council for Technical Education (AICTE).

See also
 List of Educational Institutions in Erode

References

External links
 

Arts colleges in India
Universities and colleges in Erode district
Education in Erode
Educational institutions established in 1971
1971 establishments in Tamil Nadu
Colleges affiliated to Bharathiar University